Howard Malcom (January 19, 1799 – March 25, 1879) was an American educator and Baptist minister. He wrote several noteworthy literature about his missionary travels in Burma and was pastor of churches in Hudson, New York, and Philadelphia, Pennsylvania. He also served as president of Georgetown College, Bucknell University and Drexel University College of Medicine.

Early life 
He was born on January 19, 1799, in Philadelphia, Pennsylvania, to John J. and Deborah Howard Malcom. He attended Dickinson College and Princeton Theological Seminary.

Career 
In 1835, he went on his own missions to India, Burma, Siam, China, and Africa. He wrote some valuable literature about his missionary travels, notably, in 1839, Travels in South-Eastern Asia, embracing Hindustan, Malaya, Siam, and China, and in 1840, Travels in the Burman Empire. In 1843, mainly due to these writings, he received Doctorates of Divinity from Union College and University of Vermont.

Due to loss of his voice, he was required to give up preaching. Later, he became President at Georgetown College in Kentucky until he resigned in 1850, and of the University at Lewisburg in Pennsylvania (later, Bucknell University). From 1874 to 1879, Malcom served as President of Hahnemann Medical College (now Drexel University College of Medicine) in Philadelphia.

Death 
At the age of eighty, he died in Philadelphia on March 25, 1879.

References

1799 births
1879 deaths
Dickinson College alumni
Presidents of Georgetown College (Kentucky)
Presidents of Bucknell University